Kwamina Egyir Asaam was a Ghanaian politician in the first republic. He was the member of parliament for the Aowin constituency from 1965 to 1966. Prior to entering parliament he was the Western Regional Secretary for Education for the Convention People's Party.

See also
 List of MPs elected in the 1965 Ghanaian parliamentary election

References

Ghanaian MPs 1965–1966
Convention People's Party (Ghana) politicians
20th-century Ghanaian politicians
Possibly living people
Year of birth missing